KF Besa Dobërdoll is a football club based in the village of Dobri Dol,  Gostivar, North Macedonia. They are currently competing in the Macedonian Second League.

Players

Current squad

References

External links
Club info at MacedonianFootball 

Besa Doberdoll
Association football clubs established in 1976
1976 establishments in the Socialist Republic of Macedonia
Besa Doberdoll